Justicia petiolaris is a plant species in the family Acanthaceae. It is native to Eswatini and eastern and southern South Africa.

Subspecies

There are three subspecies:
 Justicia petiolaris subsp. petiolaris
 Justicia petiolaris subsp. bowiei (C.B. CI.) Immelman
 Justicia petiolaris subsp. incerta (C.B. CI.) Immelman

References

petiolaris